Karen M. Peterson is an American politician serving as a member of the Utah House of Representatives. As a member of the Republican Party, Peterson represents the 13th district, which covers a portion of Davis County, Utah.

Early life and education
Peterson studied at Utah State University graduating in 2002 with a B.A. in Political Science. She then went to Southern Utah University to receive a M.P.A. in State and Local Government, graduating in 2016.

Career

Politics
Peterson was elected a member of the Clinton City Council in 2013. She resigned in 2020 after being selected as Legislative Liaison for Governor Spencer Cox.

After Paul Ray resigned on December 15, 2021, Peterson was elected during a special election of the Davis County Republican Party.

Representative Peterson's current committees are:
Health and Human Services Interim Committee
House Health and Human Services Committee
House Transportation Committee
Social Services Appropriations Subcommittee
Transportation Interim Committee

Other Work 
After being elected in December, Peterson started work in January as the Community Development Manager for Sunrise Engineering.

References

External links
 Official page at the Utah State Legislature
 Karen Peterson on Project Vote Smart
 Karen Peterson on BallotPedia

Living people
Republican Party members of the Utah House of Representatives
Year of birth missing (living people)
Women state legislators in Utah
21st-century American women politicians
People from Davis County, Utah
Women city councillors in Utah
Utah State University alumni
Southern Utah University alumni
21st-century American politicians